Jobim is the eighth studio album by Antônio Carlos Jobim. It was released in 1973. In Brazil, it was released as Matita Perê without the additional English version of Águas de Março (Waters of March).

Track listing

The album was arranged, conducted and produced by Claus Ogerman.

Personnel
 Antônio Carlos Jobim – guitar, piano vocals (tracks 1, 2, 3, 6, 9)
 Harry Lookofsky – tenor violin, concertmaster
 Urbie Green - trombone
 Ray Beckenstein, Phil Bodner, Jerry Dodgion, Don Hammond, Romeo Penque - woodwinds
 Richard Davis, Ron Carter – bass
 Airto Moreira, George Devens, João Palma – percussion

References

1973 albums
Antônio Carlos Jobim albums
Albums arranged by Claus Ogerman
MCA Records albums
Verve Records albums